Michael "Clip" Payne (born William Michael Payne on September 25, 1958 in Detroit, Michigan) is an American musician. He has been a member of Parliament , Funkadelic, The P-Funk Allstars and the Parliament-Funkadelic collective since 1977.

Career
First credited on Parliament's 1979 release "Gloryhallastoopid" with "Choir Chours", he has appeared on over 20 Parliament-Funkadelic collective recordings primarily as a vocalist and keyboardist. Payne, who is sometimes called "The Man in the Box", typically acts as an on-stage commentator during Parliament-Funkadelic's live performances.

Payne's first professional work was the recording of Edwin Starr's "Twenty-Five Miles" with producer Norman Whitfield.

Payne founded WEFUNK International in the late 1980s as a vehicle for his solo projects which became WEFUNK AD2k Records and Filmworks in 1999. Payne is listed as the CEO of the company which is based in Woodstock, NY. Currently associated with the label are the groups DRUGS, 420 Funk Mob, and Cacophonic FM, all of which are led by Payne, as well as Stefanie Keys, Joey Eppard, and Stoney Clove Lane.

The winter of 2019 Mike Clip Payne and Parliament/Funkadelic have begun the band's final "One Nation Under A Groove" Tour with Fishbone, Galactic, Dumpstaphunk and Miss Velvet and the Blue Wolf. This year has also seen the debut of Mr Payne as an actor, appearing in the Independent film "The Plagiarists". Variety stated, "Michael Payne is a musician and it shows in his delicious, melodic delivery of this prose-poem."  His performance was singled out by the online publication, Film Threat, "Clip is welcoming but laconic. Payne does a formidable job balancing 'Warm and Erie'.. kudos to Payne who expertly handles a tricky scene."

Selected discography

Funkadelic

1978
Funkadelic: One Nation Under a Groove
Released: 1978
Label: Warner Brothers

1979
Funkadelic: Uncle Jam Wants You
Released: 1979
Label: Warner Brothers

1981
Funkadelic: The Electric Spanking of War Babies
Released: 1981
Label: Warner Brothers

2014
Funkadelic: First Ya Gotta Shake the Gate
Released: 2014
Label: The C Kunspyruhzy

Parliament

1977 Parliament: Funkentelechy vs the Placebo Syndrome
Released: 1977
Label: Casablanca

1977
Parliament: Live (PFunk Earth Tour
Released: 1977
Label: Casablanca

1978 
Parliament: Motor Booty Affair
Released: 1978
Label: Casablanca

1979
Parliament: Gloryhollastupid (Pin the Tail on the Funky)
Released: 1979
Label: Casablanca

1980
Parliament: Trombipulation
Released: 1980
Label: Casablanca

1994 
Parliament Funkadelic P Funk Allstars: Dope Dog
Released: 1984
Label: P-Vine Records

2004
George Clinton & Parliament/Funkadelic: Midtown Music Festival, Atlanta Georgia, 5/1/04
Released: 2004
Label: Instant live

2005
George Clinton & Parliament/Funkadelic: State Theater Portland Maine 
Released: 2005
Label: Instant live

2015
George Clinton & Parliament/Funkadelic: Chocolate City/London, P-Funk Live at Metropolis Box Set
Released: 2015
Label: Metropolis Recording

2018
Parliament: Medicated Fraud Dog
Released: 2018
Label: P-Vine

George Clinton albums

1982 George Clinton Computer Games
Released:
Label: Capitol Records

1983 George Clinton You Shouldn't-Nuf Bit Fish
Released:
Label: Capitol Records

1985 George Clinton Some of My Best Jokes Are Friends
Released:
Label: Capitol Records

1986 George Clinton R&B Skeletons in the Closet
Released:
Label: Capitol Records

1989 George Clinton The Cinderella Theory
Released:
Label: Paisley Park Records

1993 George Clinton Hey Man, Smell My Finger
Released:
Label: Paisley Park Records

1995 George Clinton Dope Dogs
Released:
Label: XYZ

1996 George Clinton T.A.P.O.A.F.O.M.
Released:
Label: Sony 550 Music

2005 George Clinton How Late Do U Have 2BB4UR Absent?
Released: September 6, 2005
Label: The C Kunspyruhzy
Format: CD

2008 George Clinton and His Gangsters of Love
Released: September 16, 2008
Label: Shanachie
Format: CD

Mike Clip Payne Solo Albums

2000 420 Funk Mob "Live on the Off Days" **
Released August 31, 2000
label: Wefunk Ad2k Recordings & Filmworks

2001 DRUGS: The Prescription for Mis-America **
Release September 11, 2001
label: Wefunk Ad2k Recordings & Filmworks

2005 420 Funk Mob: "Live in Spain" **
Released December 1, 2005
Label: Wefunk Ad2k Recordings & Filmworks

2008 420 Funk Mob: "Screamin' for More" **
Released Sept 25 2008
label: Wefunk Ad2k Recordings & Filmworks

Collaborations

1984 Red Hot Chili Peppers: Red Hot Chili Peppers
Release date 1984 
Label: EMI America/ Enigma Records
 What It Is (Nina's Song) Bonus Track

1985 
Red Hot Chili Peppers: Freaky Styley
Release date 1985
Label: EMI America

1991
MC Solaar: "Qui Sème le Vent Récolte le Tempo" **
Released Dec 1991  
Label: Polydor Records

1992
Jordy: "Dur Dur D'Être Bébé" **
Released 1992
Label: Columbia Records
 Youngest Artist (4 year old) ever to have a #1 single

1993
Sinclair: Le Fonk/ Superkato
Released 1993 
Label: Virgin

1999
Tony Allen: "Black Voices" **
Released 1999 
Label: Comet Records

1999
Alex Gopher: "You, My Baby, and I" **
Released September 6, 1999 
Label: Go 4 Music

2000
Etienne De Crecy: "Tempovision" **
Released October 26, 2000 
label: Discus Solid

2009
John Deservio: Cycle of Pain
Released 2009 
Label: Reform Records
(JD of Black Label Society) 
 Producer

References

Sources 
 David Mills, Larry Alexander, Thomas Stanley, and Aris Thomas, George Clinton and P-Funk: An Oral History (New York: Avon, 1998). .
 Dave Thompson, Funk (San Francisco: Backbeat Books, 2001). .
 Rickey Vincent, Funk: The Music, The People, and The Rhythm of The One (New York: St. Martin's Griffin, 1996). .
 Michael Peter Balzary, Acid for the Children (New York: Grand Central Publishing, 2019) 
 Ted Fox, Showtime at the Apollo (Da Capo Press; 1983) 
 George Clinton with Ben Greenbaum, 2017 Brothas Be, Yo Like George, Ain't That Funkin' Kinda Hard On You?: A Memoir

External links
 Payne's Facebook page
 http://www.trademarkia.com/company-payne-william-michael-3315060-page-1-2

1958 births
Musicians from Detroit
African-American musicians
American funk keyboardists
Living people
P-Funk members
20th-century American keyboardists